The 18th Artistic Gymnastics World Championships were held in Varna, Bulgaria, in 1974. This was the first world championships at which the individual all-around titles were contested in a separate session of competition, rather than being decided after the team competition.

Results

Men

Team Final

All-around

Floor Exercise

Pommel Horse

Rings

Vault

Parallel Bars

Horizontal Bar

Women

Team Final

All-around

Vault

Uneven Bars

Balance Beam

Floor Exercise

Medals

References
Gymn Forum: World Championships Results
Gymnastics

World Artistic Gymnastics Championships
World Artistic Gymnastics Championships, 1974
1974 in gymnastics
Sport in Varna, Bulgaria
International gymnastics competitions hosted by Bulgaria